Elephant Parade (registered as Elephant Parade BV) is an open-air exhibition dedicated to saving the Asian elephant from extinction. For one or more months, hundreds of painted elephant sculptures specially created by artists are placed in the streets of one or more host cities with the aim of increasing public awareness of the plight of the elephant and gaining support for Asian elephant conservation. They are then auctioned off, with the proceeds going to the Elephant Family organisation.

History
The event was created in 2006 by Marc Spits and his son Mike. It was inspired by Marc Spits' visit (while logging in Myanmar) to the elephant hospital in Thailand, which constructs prosthetic legs for elephants that encounter landmines. There he saw Mosha, a baby elephant who lost her foot when only seven months old. Mosha was the first elephant to receive a prosthetic limb. She is fitted with a new leg every year, and must then learn to walk all over again. The documentary film The Eyes of Thailand, (narrated by Ashley Judd), shows the work of Mosha's caregiver Soraida Salwala.

The first Elephant Parade was held in Rotterdam in 2007. Antwerp followed in 2008. In 2009, Elephant Parade visited Amsterdam. In 2010, Elephant Parades were held in Emmen and London. In 2011 they were held in Heerlen, Copenhagen, Milan, Singapore, Hasselt, and in 2013 in Trier, Luxembourg and Dana Point, California. In 2014, Elephant Parade visited the UK during a National Tour and later Hong Kong, followed by Calais, Suzhou, Bangkok and Florianópolis in 2015. In 2016 Elephant Parade came to Taiwan and celebrated its 10th anniversary in Chiang Mai, Thailand. Elephant Parade returned to The Netherlands in 2017 and held another anniversary parade in Laren. Expositions were also held in São Paulo in 2017 and in India in 2017/2018.

The elephant sculptures in the Elephant Parade are all unique works donated by the artists, who include both established and emerging unknowns and celebrities. They are exhibited in the streets of the host city for one or more months and then auctioned off (by a well known auction house such as Christie's or Sotheby's), with the proceeds going to Elephant Family and the Friends of the Asian Elephant Hospital, home of Mosha, in Lampang, which seeks to save the Asian elephant and return it to its natural habitat. Money raised through Elephant Parade has been used to support projects from elephant medical care to leasing land where elephants have sufficient space to migrate, breed and live in peace.

Elephant Parade Amsterdam
In 2009 over 100 art elephants participated in Elephant Parade Amsterdam, created by artists including Jan des Bouvrie, Henk Schiffmacher, Menno Baars, Ilse DeLange, Corneille, Rob Scholte, Raymond Hoogendorp and Daryl van Wouw. The elephants were auctioned by Christie's in November 2009. The best-selling elephant was by Corneille, a well known Dutch painter of the COBRA group, and was sold for €42,000. The BaarsFant by Menno Baars was sold for €30,000. Only a few weeks after the auction, Baars designed a second elephant, named BabyBelly. This time, however, he painted the elephant during a live session at the Kalvertoren, a shopping mall in the Kalverstraat, a famous shopping street in Amsterdam. BabyBelly is a smaller art elephant and is pregnant, depicting the conservation of its species.

Elephant Parade London

In 2010, UK conservation charity, Elephant Family, executed the exhibition. Over 250 art elephants were designed for London by Marc Quinn was sold to Amanda Eliasch, others designed by Tommy Hilfiger, Graeme Le Saux, Lulu Guinness, Martin Aveling, Diane von Furstenberg and others. The elephants were transported by Eco Movers over the course of the parade, up to the celebrity auction held in June 2010. The auction raised over £4 million ($7,150,000). The elephant created by Jack Vettriano attracted the highest bid, £155,000 ($252,600).

Elephant Parade Emmen Zoo
Also in 2010, Elephant Parade visited Emmen, in the north of the Netherlands, for the 75th anniversary of the Emmen Zoo. From Ascension day, 13 May, until the end of August, 75 art elephants were exhibited in the centre of the town and in the zoo itself. Most were created by artists from the region. The auction, held by Christie's, was at the Eden Hotel in Emmen on 9 September 2010. The best-selling elephant was again by Corneille, and was sold for €68,000 ($98,188). By a sad coincidence, Corneille had died only three days earlier.

Elephant Parade Tour Bergen
In Bergen, Netherlands, the first Elephant Parade Tour was organized. 65 smaller,  elephants were exhibited in the windows of shops and galleries in the centre of the town beginning on 22 August and then auctioned by Christie's on 30 October. €127,000 ($181,600) was raised.  On the last day of the Elephant Parade Bergen Tour, it was announced that the town council had acquired an art elephant by George Jurriaens to be placed at the local Museum Kranenburgh. Elephants from previous Elephant Parades had been temporarily placed in museums such as the Natural History Museum in London, but Bergen's was the first to acquire a position in the permanent collection of a museum.

Elephant Parade 2011
In 2011, Elephant Parade elephants swarmed the streets of four cities. The first Elephant Parade that year was in Heerlen, from 25 March through 25 May, organized by Stichting Vrouwen laten Heerlen Glimlachen (Foundation Women Put a Smile on Heerlen) and exhibited 40 art elephants. The auction was held on 28 May 2011. Elephant Parades were also held in Copenhagen (1 June – 25 August 2011, 102 elephants), in Milan (16 September – 15 November 2011) and in Singapore (11 November 2011 – January 2012).

Elephant Parade 2012
In 2012, the Elephant Parade was held in Hasselt, Belgium, from 1 September to 1 November.

Elephant Parade 2013: Trier and Luxembourg
From 18 July to 18 October 40 elephants were on display in Trier and 55 in Luxembourg, the first time cities in Germany and Luxembourg have hosted the Elephant Parade.

Elephant Parade 2014: Hong Kong
In 2014 Elephant Parade came to Hong Kong where it had over 100 statues on display. The auction raised approximately $277,398 which was donated to the Asian Elephant Foundation, whose conservation efforts range from funding hospitals to lobbying governments.

Elephant Parade: Welcome to America
Also in 2013, for the first time on American soil, dozens of life-size baby elephant sculptures were on display in the Orange County, California seaside city Dana Point. Elephant Parade USA Ambassador Dana Yarger appeared on a local Los Angeles news station in May 2013 to advertise the event.

Elephant Parade 2015: Florianópolis 
In December 2015, for the first time in Brazil, Elephant Parade was held in Florianópolis, until March 2016. The sculptures were placed around the city, both the island and the continent.

Elephant Parade 2017: São Paulo 
In June 2017, Elephant Parade was held in São Paulo. Around 85 sculptures were created and placed in public places around the city, making the Parade the largest art exhibition in the city's history.

Elephant Parade 2018: Rio de Janeiro 
From August to November 2018, Elephant Parade was held in Rio. The concept of the event was "Colorir o Rio é a Parada".

Supporters
Supporters of Elephant Parade include Boris Johnson (Mayor of London), Sarah, Duchess of York, Sir Evelyn de Rothschild, Goldie Hawn, Khloe Kardashian, Katy Perry, Tommy Hilfiger, Isaac Mizrahi, Lucy Fleming, jewellery designer Loree Rodkin, Diane von Fürstenberg, Paul Sorvino, Ilse DeLange, Jan Mol, Joanna Lumley, Job Cohen (mayor of Amsterdam), Jonnie Boer, Michael Palin, Rob de Nijs, and Prince Henrik of Denmark, who also created an elephant for Elephant Parade Copenhagen.

See also
The Big Egg Hunt, a 2012 charity event that also raised money for elephants
CowParade, the first such international exhibition of animal sculptures

References

External links 

Elephant conservation
Painted statue public art
Elephants in art
Contemporary art exhibitions